Saint-Vérand is a commune in the Rhône department in eastern France.

Population and housing of Saint-Vérand 
The population of Saint-Vérand was 993 in 1999, 1082 in 2006, and 1192 in 2017. The population density of Saint-Vérand is 68 inhabitants per km². The number of housing of Saint-Vérand was 533 in 2007. These homes of Saint-Vérand consist of 432 main residences, 68 second or occasional homes and 33 vacant homes.

See also
Communes of the Rhône department

References

Communes of Rhône (department)